Robert John Wiley (born 24 March 1955) is a former Australian rules footballer who played for the Perth Football Club in the West Australian Football League (WAFL) and for the Richmond Football Club and West Coast Eagles in the Victorian Football League (VFL). 

An inaugural member of the West Australian Football Hall of Fame, Wiley is regarded as one of the finest rovers of his era.

Career
He won the Butcher Medal as Perth's best and fairest in his first season. He was a member of premiership sides in 1976 and 1977, and in that latter season kicked over eighty goals despite missing nine weeks through injury before the Grand Final. Remarkably for a rover, Wiley twice kicked ten goals in a match in 1977, including once against  where he had forty-two possessions for ten goals and four behinds. An exceptionally pacy rover, Wiley played with Perth before and after his VFL stint and won a club record eight best and fairest awards in total. He finished with 174 senior games and coached the club in 1988 and 1989. In 2015, Wiley was inducted into the Perth Hall of Fame, as one of its four inaugural members of its elite 'Mighty Demons' category.

Richmond had recruited Wiley in 1979 and he played in their 1980 VFL Grand Final winning side. He kicked forty goals in 1982 and left the club the following season, returning to Western Australia where in 1987 he would return to the VFL for a season with the newly formed West Coast.

In 2021, Wiley was inducted into the Australian Football Hall of Fame and was inducted by former teammate and close friend Mick Malthouse.

Coaching
After his season with West Coast, Wiley returned as coach of his old club Perth, succeeding Mal Brown. In his first season (1988), Wiley took the Demons to their second season with more wins than losses since the 1978 WANFL season, and they were unlucky not to make the finals, losing out only when South Fremantle and East Fremantle beat top two sides Claremont and Subiaco in the final round after having been third for most of the season. The following year, however, Perth fell away to sixth after being last for a substantial period and Wiley's contract was not renewed. He still has the best win–loss record, however, of any coach of Perth since Ken Armstrong retired. Wiley later was the last State of Origin coach for Western Australian in 1998. He was for many years an assistant coach with former club West Coast, being a runner for the clubs first two premierships in 1992 and 1994 under his 1980 Richmond premiership teammate Mick Malthouse, he was an assistant to John Worsfold in the 2006 premiership win. He was appointed to the role of director development and coaching.

In 2021, Wiley returned to West Coast as its WAFL team coach from the 2022 season, he is also the Eagles number 1 ticket holder for the 2021 and 2022 AFL seasons.

References

External links

Robert Wiley player profile page at WAFL FootyFacts
Profile at WA Football Hall of Fame website

1955 births
Living people
All-Australians (1953–1988)
People educated at Scotch College, Perth
Australian rules footballers from Perth, Western Australia
Perth Football Club players
Perth Football Club coaches
Richmond Football Club players
Richmond Football Club Premiership players
West Coast Eagles players
Western Australian State of Origin players
West Australian Football Hall of Fame inductees
Australia international rules football team players
One-time VFL/AFL Premiership players